Kobayat International Festivals is an annual international music festival held in Kobayat, Lebanon.

It has become the cultural festival of reference in the Akkar region with a daily programme that includes music, art, sightseeing and gastronomy during the Assumption of Mary weekend . Its auditorium seats up to 3.500 people to offer an intimate experience with the audience.

History 

In 2014, the festival was founded by Cynthia Karkafi Hobeich, president of the "Ajyal for Development Foundation" to promote the heritage of Akkar, in cooperation with the Lebanese ministries of Culture and Tourism. It held its first edition on 14 and 15 August 2015 to massive success.

Awards and recognition 

The festival was the winner of the "Social and Rural Impact" award by the Lebanese Social Economic Awards in an event that was held on 28 November 2015.
It was a testament of the festival' impact on the local economy and its success in shedding the light on Akkar.

Editions

2015 edition 

It programmed the following concerts:

 14 August 2015: Wael Kfoury
 15 August 2015: Assi El Helani

2016 edition 

 05 August 2016: Mountain Bike Day and in the evening Najwa Karam Concert
 06 August 2016: Wael Kfoury Concert
 06 August 2016: Hiking Day
 11 August 2016: Hiking Day
 12 August 2016: Boney M. Concert
 13 August 2016: Rahbani brothers Concert
 14 August 2016: Hiking Day

References

External links
Kobayat Festivals

Annual events in Lebanon
Autumn events in Lebanon